Ust-Ivanovka is a rural locality (a selo) and the administrative center of Ust-Ivanovsky Selsoviet of Blagoveshchensky District, Amur Oblast, Russia. The population was 2,656 as of 2018. There are 40 streets.

Geography 
Ust-Ivanovka is located on left bank of the Zeya River, 26 km northeast of Blagoveshchensk (the district's administrative centre) by road. Rovnoye is the nearest rural locality.

References 

Rural localities in Blagoveshchensky District, Amur Oblast